Sla Kram is a khum (commune) of Svay Chek District in Banteay Meanchey Province in north-western Cambodia.

Villages
Source:

 Sla Kram
 Kakaoh
 Kamnab
 Toap Siem
 Khlaeng Poar Cheung
 Prasat
 Kouk Ampil
 Khlaeng Poar Tboung
 Boeng Snao
 Chak Puork

References

Communes of Banteay Meanchey province
Svay Chek District